Antarctica is a continent in the Southern Hemisphere with no permanent human population.

Antarctica may also refer to:

Places
 Antarctic, the wider South Polar Region
 Antarctic Plate, the tectonic plate which covers the continent
 Antártica (commune), the Chilean commune including Chilean Antarctic territory
 Antártica Chilena Province, a Chilean province including the Chilean Antarctic territory and part of Isla Grande de Tierra del Fuego
 France Antarctique, a short-lived 16th-century colony in Brazil

Arts and entertainment

Music
 Antarctica (band), a 1990s New York band
 Antarctica (Richie Beirach album) (1985)
 Antarctica (The Secret Handshake album) (2004)
 Antarctica (Vangelis album), a 1983 soundtrack album
 Antarctica: The Bliss Out, Vol. 2, a 1997 album by Windy & Carl

Film
 Antarctica (1983 film)
 Antarctica (1991 film)
 Antarctica (1995 film)
 Antarctica (2020 film)

Other arts and entertainment
 Antarctica (novel), a 1997 science fiction novel by Kim Stanley Robinson
 Antarctica: Empire of the Penguin, a theme area opened in 2013 at SeaWorld Orlando
 Antarctica, a 1999 short story collection by Claire Keegan

See also 

 
 
 Antarctic Circle
 Antarcticavis, an extinct genus of bird
 Arctica (disambiguation)
 Antarctic (disambiguation)